The 1979 Grote Prijs Jef Scherens was the 15th edition of the Grote Prijs Jef Scherens cycle race and was held on 16 September 1979. The race started and finished in Leuven. The race was won by Marcel Laurens.

General classification

References

1979
1979 in road cycling
1979 in Belgian sport